Although diamonds on Earth are rare, extraterrestrial diamonds (diamonds formed outside of Earth) are very common. Diamonds so tiny that they contain only about 2000 carbon atoms are abundant in meteorites and some of them formed in stars before the Solar System existed. High pressure experiments suggest large amounts of diamonds are formed from methane on the ice giant planets Uranus and Neptune, while some planets in other planetary systems may be almost pure diamond. Diamonds are also found in stars and may have been the first mineral ever to have formed.

Meteorites

In 1987, a team of scientists examined some primitive meteorites and found grains of diamond about 2.5 nanometers in diameter (nanodiamonds). Trapped in them were noble gases whose isotopic signature indicated they came from outside the Solar System. Analyses of additional primitive meteorites also found nanodiamonds. The record of their origins was preserved despite a long and violent history that started when they were ejected from a star into the interstellar medium, went through the formation of the Solar System, were incorporated into a planetary body that was later broken up into meteorites, and finally crashed on the Earth's surface.

In meteorites, nanodiamonds make up about 3 percent of the carbon and 400 parts per million of the mass. Grains of silicon carbide and graphite also have anomalous isotopic patterns. Collectively they are known as presolar grains or stardust and their properties constrain models of nucleosynthesis in giant stars and supernovae.

It is unclear how many nanodiamonds in meteorites are really from outside the Solar System. Only a very small fraction of them contain noble gases of presolar origin and until recently it was not possible to study them individually. On average, the ratio of carbon-12 to carbon-13 matches that of the Earth's atmosphere while that of nitrogen-14 to nitrogen-15 matches the Sun. Techniques such as atom probe tomography will make it possible to examine individual grains, but due to the limited number of atoms, the isotopic resolution is limited.

If most nanodiamonds did form in the Solar System, that raises the question of how this is possible. On the surface of Earth, graphite is the stable carbon mineral while larger diamonds can only be formed in the kind of temperatures and pressures that are found deep in the mantle. However, nanodiamonds are close to molecular size: one with a diameter of 2.8 nm, the median size, contains about 1800 carbon atoms. In very small minerals, surface energy is important and diamonds are more stable than graphite because the diamond structure is more compact. The crossover in stability is between 1 and 5 nm. At even smaller sizes, a variety of other forms of carbon such as fullerenes can be found as well as diamond cores wrapped in fullerenes.

The most carbon-rich meteorites, with abundances up to 7 parts per thousand by weight, are ureilites. These have no known parent body and their origin is controversial. Diamonds are common in highly shocked ureilites, and most are thought to have been formed by either the shock of the impact with Earth or with other bodies in space. However, much larger diamonds were found in fragments of a meteorite called Almahata Sitta, found in the Nubian desert of Sudan. They contained inclusions of iron- and sulfur-bearing minerals, the first inclusions to be found in extraterrestrial diamonds. They were dated at 4.5 billion-year-old crystals and were formed at pressures greater than 20 gigapascals. The authors of a 2018 study concluded that they must have come from a protoplanet, no longer intact, with a size between that of the moon and Mars.

Infrared emissions from space, observed by the Infrared Space Observatory and the Spitzer Space Telescope, has made it clear that carbon-containing molecules are ubiquitous in space. These include polycyclic aromatic hydrocarbons (PAHs), fullerenes and diamondoids (hydrocarbons that have the same crystal structure as diamond). If dust in space has a similar concentration, a gram of it would carry up to 10 quadrillion of them, but so far there is little evidence for their presence in the interstellar medium; they are difficult to tell apart from diamondoids.

A 2014 study led by James Kennett at the University of California Santa Barbara identified a thin layer of diamonds spread over three continents. This lent support to a contentious hypothesis that a collision of a large comet with the Earth about 13,000 years ago caused the extinction of megafauna in North America and put an end to the Clovis culture during the Younger Dryas period.  The reported nanodiamond data are considered by some as the strongest physical evidence for a Younger Dryas impact/bolide event. However that study was severely flawed and was based on questionable and unreliable methods to measure nanodiamond abundances in the sediments.  Furthermore, most of the reported 'nanodiamonds' at the Younger Dryas boundary are not diamond at all, but rather reported as the controversial 'n-diamond'. The use of 'n-diamond' as an impact marker, is problematic due to the presence of native Cu nanocrystals in sediments that can be easily confused for 'n-diamond', should that controversial carbon phase even exist.

Planets

Solar System

In 1981, Marvin Ross wrote a paper titled "The ice layer in Uranus and Neptune—diamonds in the sky?" in which he proposed that huge quantities of diamonds might be found in the interior of these planets. At Lawrence Livermore, he had analyzed data from shock-wave compression of methane (CH4) and found that the extreme pressure separated the carbon atom from the hydrogen, freeing it to form diamond.

Theoretical modeling by Sandro Scandolo and others predicted that diamonds would form at pressures over 300 gigapascals (GPa), but even at lower pressures methane would be disrupted and form chains of hydrocarbons. High pressure experiments at the University of California Berkeley using a diamond anvil cell found both phenomena at only 50 GPa and a temperature of 2500 kelvins, equivalent to depths of 7000 kilometers below Neptune's cloud tops. Another experiment at the Geophysical Laboratory saw methane becoming unstable at only 7 GPa and 2000 kelvins. After forming, denser diamonds would sink. This "diamond rain" would convert potential energy into heat and help drive the convection that generates Neptune's magnetic field.

There are some uncertainties in how well the experimental results apply to Uranus and Neptune. Water and hydrogen mixed with the methane may alter the chemical reactions. A physicist at the Fritz Haber Institute in Berlin showed that the carbon on these planets is not concentrated enough to form diamonds from scratch. A proposal that diamonds may also form in Jupiter and Saturn, where the concentration of carbon is far lower, was considered unlikely because the diamonds would quickly dissolve.

Experiments looking for conversion of methane to diamonds found weak signals and did not reach the temperatures and pressures expected in Uranus and Neptune. However, a recent experiment used shock heating by lasers to reach temperatures and pressures expected at a depth of 10,000 kilometers below the surface of Uranus. When they did this to polystyrene, nearly every carbon atom in the material was incorporated into diamond crystals within a nanosecond.

Extrasolar

In the Solar System the rocky planets Mercury, Venus, Earth and Mars are 70% to 90% silicates by mass. By contrast, stars with a high ratio of carbon to oxygen may be orbited by planets that are mostly carbides, with the most common material being silicon carbide. This has a higher thermal conductivity and a lower thermal expansivity than silicates. This would result in more rapid conductive cooling near the surface, but lower down the convection could be at least as vigorous as that in silicate planets.

One such planet is PSR J1719-1438 b, companion to a millisecond pulsar. It has a density at least twice that of lead, and may be composed mainly of ultra-dense diamond. It is believed to be the remnant of a white dwarf after the pulsar stripped away more than 99 percent of its mass.

Another planet, 55 Cancri e, has been called a "super-Earth" because, like Earth, it is a rocky planet orbiting a sun-like star, but it has twice the radius and eight times the mass. The researchers who discovered it in 2012 concluded  that it was carbon-rich, making an abundance of diamond likely. However, later analyses using multiple measures for the star's chemical composition indicated that the star has 25 percent more oxygen than carbon. This makes it less likely that the planet itself is a carbon planet.

Stars
It has been proposed that diamonds exist in carbon-rich stars, particularly white dwarfs; Carbonado, a polycrystalline mix of diamond, graphite, and amorphous carbon, which is one of the hardest natural forms of carbon, is also present,  and could come from supernovae and white dwarfs. For this reason it was given the nickname Lucy.

In 2008, Robert Hazen and colleagues at the Carnegie Institution in Washington, D.C. published a paper, "Mineral evolution", in which they explored the history of mineral formation and found that the diversity of minerals has changed over time as the conditions have changed. Before the Solar System formed, only a small number of minerals were present, including diamonds and olivine. The first minerals may have been small diamonds formed in stars because stars are rich in carbon and diamonds form at a higher temperature than any other known mineral.

See also
Extraterrestrial materials

References

Diamond
Meteorite mineralogy and petrology
Planetary geology